The 1989–90 Princeton Tigers men's basketball team represented Princeton University in intercollegiate college basketball during the 1989–90 NCAA Division I men's basketball season. The head coach was Pete Carril and the team captains was Matt Lapin. The team played its home games in the Jadwin Gymnasium on the University campus in Princeton, New Jersey.  The team was the champion of the Ivy League, which earned them an invitation to the 64-team 1990 NCAA Division I men's basketball tournament where they were seeded thirteenth in the Midwest Region.

The team posted a 20–7 overall record and an 11–3 conference record.  In a March 15, 1990 NCAA Division I men's basketball tournament Midwest Regional first round game at the Erwin Events Center in Austin, Texas against the Arkansas Razorbacks, they lost by a 68–64 margin. Kit Mueller cut the lead to two points with 14 seconds remaining, but Arkansas made its free throws to close out the game.  When the team beat  66–28 on February 10, 1990, it established a new National Collegiate Athletic Association Division I record for fewest points allowed (since 1986) while running the Princeton offense.  The team would break its own record the following year.

The team was led by first team All-Ivy League selection Mueller, who earned the Ivy League Men's Basketball Player of the Year award as well as third team Academic All-America recognition from College Sports Information Directors of America.  Lapin led the nation in three-point field goal shooting percentage (53.4%, 71 of 133), and the team led the nation in both three point shooting percentage (45.2) and scoring defense with a 51.0 average. Lapin also led the Ivy League in three point shooting percentage in conference games with a 57.7% average.  The scoring defense statistical championship was the second of twelve consecutive titles.

References

Princeton Tigers men's basketball seasons
Princeton Tigers
Princeton
Prince
Prince